Theodore Russell may refer to:

Theodore E. Russell (born 1936), U.S. ambassador to Slovakia
Ted Russell (musician), American conductor